Tony Doyle may refer to:

 Tony Doyle (actor) (1942–2000), Irish television and film actor
 Tony Doyle (cyclist) (born 1958), English cycle frame builder and former professional cyclist
 Tony Doyle (politician) (1953–1994), Australian politician
 Tony Doyle (rugby union) (born 1958), Irish rugby union player